Fyresvatnet or Fyresvatn is a lake in Fyresdal Municipality in Vestfold og Telemark county, Norway.

At the southern end of the lake, the sides of the lake are steep and sparsely inhabited. At the north end, near Moland Church, the terrain is more open and the residential areas are more dense. This is the site of the village of Moland (the municipal centre).

Fyresvatnet belongs to the Arendal watershed, and discharges via the Fyresdalsåna river into the Nidelva river, which flows into the Skagerrak at Arendal in Agder county.

See also
List of lakes in Norway

References

Fyresdal
Lakes of Vestfold og Telemark